Kollet may refer to:

Kollet, Labé, a sub-prefecture in Guinea
Kollet, Télimélé, a sub-prefecture in Guinea